J. Lee Morford (June 14, 18731940) was a Michigan politician.

Early life
Morford was born on June 14, 1873 in Unionville, Michigan. Morford was of Scottish ancestry. When Morford was fifteen, he took over management of the farm he spent most of his previous life on. When he was eighteen years old, Morford moved to Caro, Michigan, where he graduated high school. In 1900, he moved to Gaylord, Michigan.

Career
In Gaylord, Morford served four terms as village president. At some point in his life, Morford worked as an undertaker and at some point as a banker. On November 8, 1910, Morford was elected as a Republican member of the Michigan House of Representatives from the Presque Isle County district. He served in this position from January 4, 1911 to 1914. On November 3, 1914, Morford was elected to the Michigan Senate where he represented the 29th district. He served in this position from January 6, 1915 to 1918.

Personal life
Morford was married to Grace.

Death
Morford died in 1940. He was interred at Fairview Cemetery in Gaylord, Michigan.

References

1873 births
1940 deaths
American funeral directors
American bankers
Republican Party Michigan state senators
Burials in Michigan
Republican Party members of the Michigan House of Representatives
20th-century American politicians